The Encyclopedic Dictionary of Astronomy is a Ukrainian encyclopedia of astronomy. It was published in 2003 and has around 3000 entries.

See also

 List of astronomical observatories in Ukraine
 List of Ukrainian encyclopedias
 Science and technology in Ukraine

References

2003 non-fiction books
Ukrainian encyclopedias
Ukrainian-language encyclopedias
Encyclopedias of science
21st-century encyclopedias